Julia Catherine Stimson  (May 26, 1881 – September 30, 1948) was an American nurse, credited as one of several persons who brought nursing to the status of a profession.

Early life
Julia Catherine Stimson was born in Worcester, Massachusetts 26 May 1881. Her parents were the Reverend Henry A. Stimson and Alice Bartlett Stimson. She had five siblings: Dr. Barbara B. Stimson, Dr Philip M. Stimson, Elsie Stimson Smith, Lucile Stimson Harvey and Henry B. Stimson. She was also first cousin to Secretary of War and Secretary of State Henry L. Stimson. She received her bachelor's degree from Vassar College in 1901, then received a degree from the New York Hospital Training School for Nurses in 1908. She held a number of administrative posts in New York City and Missouri, where she received her master's degree from Washington University in St. Louis in 1917. She volunteered for military service in April 1917.

Military career

As superintendent of the Army Nurse Corps during World War I, Stimson became the first woman to attain the rank of Major (United States) in the United States Army. 
Mary T. Sarnecky, author of A History of the U.S. Army Nurse Corps (Penn Press, 1993) wrote, "Stimson actively lived a feminist ideology in several singularly oppressive and paternalistic contexts--the upper-class Victorian home, the turn-of-the-century hospital setting and the military establishment of the early 20th century."

Thousands of women nurses enlisted in the Corps, and returned from the War as both professionals and veterans. Stimson was awarded the United States Distinguished Service Medal, presented by General John J. Pershing. She was also awarded the Royal Red Cross.  Though she retired from the Army in 1937, Stimson returned after the outbreak of World War II as chief of the Nursing Council on National Defense, and recruited a new generation of women to serve as nurses. She was promoted to full colonel in 1948, shortly before her death.  Stimson, who served as President of the American Nursing Association from 1938 to 1944, was inducted into that association's Hall of Fame in 1976.

Her papers are housed at the Weill Cornell Medical Center Archives.

Awards
Distinguished Service Medal
World War I Victory Medal
American Campaign Medal
World War II Victory Medal
Royal Red Cross (United Kingdom)
Florence Nightingale Medal (1929)

Distinguished Service Medal citation
The President of the United States of America, authorized by Act of Congress, July 9, 1918, takes pleasure in presenting the Army Distinguished Service Medal to Chief Nurse Julia C. Stimson, United States Army Nurse Corps, for exceptionally meritorious and distinguished services to the Government of the United States, in a duty of great responsibility during World War I. As Chief Nurse of Base Hospital No. 21, Chief Nurse Stimson displayed marked organizing and administering ability while that unit was on active service with the British forces. Her devotion to duty was exceptional while she was Chief Nurse of the American Red Cross in France. Upon her appointment as Director of Nursing Service of the American Expeditionary Forces, she performed exacting duties with conspicuous energy and achieved brilliant results. Thousands of sick and wounded were cared for properly throughout the efficient services she provided.

Bibliography

References

External links

Army Nurse Corps Association - MAJ Julia C. Stimson

1881 births
1948 deaths
United States Army colonels
Recipients of the Distinguished Service Medal (US Army)
Members of the Royal Red Cross
United States Army Nurse Corps officers
American women in World War I
Vassar College alumni
United States Army personnel of World War I
Female wartime nurses
Florence Nightingale Medal recipients
Washington University in St. Louis alumni
Female nurses in World War I
Female United States Army nurses in World War II